Aglaia cuspidata is a species of plant in the family Meliaceae. It is endemic to Papua New Guinea.

References

Flora of Papua New Guinea
cuspidata
Vulnerable plants
Taxonomy articles created by Polbot